Kochergin or Kocherhin (from кочерга meaning fire iron) is a Russian masculine surname, its feminine counterpart is Kochergina or Kocherhina. It may refer to
Evgeny Kochergin (born 1945), Russian speaker and presenter
Ivan Kochergin (born 1935), Russian wrestler 
Tetyana Kocherhina (born 1956), Ukrainian handball player

Russian-language surnames